Ortalis aequifera is a species of ulidiid or picture-winged fly in the genus Ortalis of the family Tephritidae.

References

Ortalis (fly)